Tripuri cuisine is the type of food served in Tripura, in northeastern India. The Tripuris are essentially nonvegetarians and hence the main courses are mainly prepared using meat, but with the addition of vegetables.

See also
 Tripuri culture
 Tripuri people

References
 Chahmung Borok (The dishes of the Borok people), Narendra Debbarma, KOHM.

External links

 
Indian cuisine by culture
Indian cuisine by state or union territory